The High Commissioner of the United Kingdom to Seychelles is the United Kingdom's foremost diplomatic representative to the Republic of Seychelles, and in charge of the UK's diplomatic mission in Victoria.

As the Republic of Seychelles is a member of the Commonwealth, the UK and Seychelles exchange High Commissioners rather than ambassadors.

High Commissioners to Seychelles

1975–1976: Sir Colin Allan
1976–1980: John Pugh
1980–1983: Eric Young
1983–1986: Colin Mays
1986–1989: Peter Smart
1989–1991: Guy Hart
1992–1995: John Sharland
1995–1997: Peter Thomson
1998–2002: John Yapp
2002–2004: Fraser Wilson
2004–2007: Diana Skingle
2007–2009: Fergus Cochrane-Dyet
2009–2012: Matthew Forbes
2012–2015: Lindsay Skoll

2015–2019: Caron Röhsler
From August 2019: Patrick Lynch

References

External links
UK and Seychelles, gov.uk

Seychelles
United Kingdom